Danny Romero may refer to:
 Danny Romero (boxer)
 Danny Romero (singer)

See also
 Daniel Romero, Argentine footballer